Arun Kant Yadav is an Indian politician and a member of 17th Legislative Assembly, Uttar Pradesh of India. He represents the Phoolpur Pawai constituency in Azamgarh district of Uttar Pradesh and is the only BJP legislator from the region.

Political career
Arun Kant Yadav is an Indian politician and a member of 17th Legislative Assembly, Uttar Pradesh of India. He represents the ‘Phoolpur Pawai’ constituency in Azamgarh district of Uttar Pradesh.

Posts held

See also
Uttar Pradesh Legislative Assembly

References

People from Gorakhpur
Bharatiya Janata Party politicians from Uttar Pradesh
Uttar Pradesh MLAs 2017–2022
Living people
1980 births